The Jean-Claude Richard, Abbot of Saint-Non, Dressed à l'Espagnole  is a painting by Jean-Honoré Fragonard conserved at the National Art Museum of Catalonia.

Description 
The knight, with his arrogant pose, is sitting beside a fountain in which his horse is drinking. He is dressed à l'espagnole, an expression which in eighteenth-century France was used to refer to picturesque or fancy attire, and had no bearing on the Spanish fashions of the time. In fact, dress à l'espagnole was inspired by French fashions from the time of Henry IV and Louis XIII. The picture is a work from the artist's youth, painted on a trip he made to Italy with his friend and patron Jean-Claude Richard. Fragonard was one of the last representatives of rococo art and this work shows his most characteristic style: touches of light material known as 'virtuosity of speed'.

References

External links 
  The artwork at Museum's website

Catalan paintings
Paintings in the collection of the Museu Nacional d'Art de Catalunya
1769 paintings
Horses in art